The Independence Party (TIP), also known as the Alberta Independence Party from 2001 to 2019 and the Independence Party of Alberta after 2019, is an Albertan provincial political party.

The party was originally dedicated to increasing the autonomy of Alberta within the Canadian confederation, partly as a response to the failure of the Canadian Alliance to gain traction outside Western Canada in the 2000 Canadian election. One of the party's first challenges was to gather enough signatures to qualify as an official party in Alberta, which it failed to do. In light of this development, its fourteen candidates were forced to stand as independents in the 2001 Alberta general election. The party had a separatist political platform in the 2019 Alberta general election.

History 
The AIP disbanded in 2001, re-formed in 2017 and fielded 63 candidates in the 2019 Alberta general election, winning no seats. Dave Bjorkman became interim party leader from early 2018 until his resignation in July 2019. Bjorkman opposed Alberta's Bill 24 in November 2017, citing fears that the law would encourage keeping secrets from parents and saying that he supports the LGBT+ community and parental involvement in the Alberta school system. Dave Campbell was elected party leader in the spring of 2020.

Election results 

Party candidates received a total of 7,521 votes in the 2001 election:
Bradley R. Lang (Calgary-Egmont) 399 (2.90 percent)
Tom Humble (Airdrie-Rocky View) 683 (4.10 percent)
Cory Morgan (Banff-Cochrane) 538 (four percent)
Darren Popik (Calgary Shaw) 151 (0.60 percent)
Douglas R. Chitwood (Lacombe-Stettler) 554 (4.70 percent)
Eileen Walker (Drumheller-Chinook) 819 (8.90 percent)
Ron (Earl) Miller (Dunvegan) 248 (2.8 percent)
Dennis Young (Grande Prairie-Smoky) 380 (4.1 percent)
Jon Koch (Little Bow) 885 (8.3 percent)
Charles Park (Ponoka-Rimbey) 764 (8.1 percent)
Ryan Lamarche (Red Deer-South) 203 (1.6 percent)
Christopher Sutherland (Strathmore-Brooks) 511 (4.5 percent)
Jeff Newland (Wainwright) 868 (eight percent)
Ben Lussier (Wetaskiwin-Camrose) 382 (three percent)
Lussier began his candidacy with an AIP endorsement, which was withdrawn during the campaign.

See also
 Alberta separatism
 Movements for the annexation of Canada to the United States 
 List of political parties in Alberta
 Politics of Alberta
 Secessionist movements of Canada
 Western alienation
 Western Canada Concept

References

Provincial political parties in Alberta
Political parties established in 2000
Political parties disestablished in 2001
Political parties established in 2018
Secessionist organizations in Canada
Defunct political parties in Canada
Conservative parties in Canada
2000 establishments in Alberta
2001 disestablishments in Alberta
2018 establishments in Alberta